Julien Galipeau (born 29 January 1981) is a Canadian male weightlifter, competing in the 85 kg category and representing Canada at international competitions. He competed at world championships, most recently at the 2001 World Weightlifting Championships.

Major results

References

External link
 
 

1981 births
Living people
Canadian male weightlifters
Place of birth missing (living people)
Weightlifters at the 2002 Commonwealth Games
Commonwealth Games medallists in weightlifting
Commonwealth Games silver medallists for Canada
Commonwealth Games bronze medallists for Canada
20th-century Canadian people
21st-century Canadian people
Medallists at the 2002 Commonwealth Games